The Minnesota Department of Iron Range Resources and Rehabilitation (IRRRB) is an economic development agency of the State of Minnesota, designed to advance growth on Minnesota's Iron Range. Founded in 1941, the board is tasked with using proceeds from taconite mining to spur broader development in the region.

The mission of IRRRB is to "invest in resources to foster vibrant growth and economic prosperity in northeastern Minnesota by enhancing livable communities, maximizing collaborations and partnerships and strengthen businesses and worker education. The agency provides vital funding, including low or no interest loans and grants for businesses relocating or expanding in the region. Additionally, a variety of grants are available to local units of government, education institutions, and nonprofits that promote workforce development and sustainable communities." The board is headquartered in Eveleth, Minnesota.

The board's commissioner is appointed by the sitting governor and serves as a member of the governor's cabinet. The current commissioner is Ida Rukavina. The IRRR Advisory Board consists of the state senators and representatives elected from districts in which one-third or more of the residents reside within the taconite assistance area. The board is headquartered in Eveleth, Minnesota.

References

External links
 What the heck is the IRRRB? by Aaron Brown

State agencies of Minnesota